IKAROS (Interplanetary Kite-craft Accelerated by Radiation Of the Sun) is a Japan Aerospace Exploration Agency (JAXA) experimental spacecraft. The spacecraft was launched on 20 May 2010, aboard an H-IIA rocket, together with the Akatsuki (Venus Climate Orbiter) probe and four other small spacecraft. IKAROS is the first spacecraft to successfully demonstrate solar sail technology in interplanetary space.

Purpose
The IKAROS probe is the world's first spacecraft to use solar sailing as the main propulsion. It was designed to demonstrate four key technologies (comments in parentheses refer to figure):
 Deployment and control of a large, thin solar sail membrane (grey-blue areas numbered 3)
 Thin-film solar cells integrated into the sail to power the payload (black rectangles numbered 4)
 Measurement of acceleration due to radiation pressure on the solar sail
 Attitude control by varying the reflectance of 80 liquid crystal panels embedded in the sail (orange rectangles numbered 2)

The mission also includes investigations of aspects of interplanetary space, such as gamma-ray bursts, solar wind and cosmic dust.

The probe's ALADDIN instrument (ALDN-S and ALDN-E) measured the variation in dust density while its Gamma-Ray Burst Polarimeter (GAP) measured the polarization of gamma-ray bursts during its six-month cruise.

IKAROS is to be followed by a  sail, the Jupiter Trojan Asteroid Explorer, intended to journey to Jupiter and the Trojan asteroids, to be launched in the late 2020s, with a proposed goal of returning an asteroid sample to Earth in the 2050s.

Design

A thin-film solar array is embedded in the sail (key item 4 in figure at right). PowerFilm, Inc. provided the thin-film solar array. Eighty blocks of LCD panels are embedded in the sail, whose reflectance can be adjusted for attitude control (key item 2 in figure at right). The sail also contains eight dust counters on the opposite face as part of the science payload.

Mission progress
IKAROS was successfully launched together with Akatsuki (the Venus Climate Orbiter) aboard an H-IIA rocket from the Tanegashima Space Center on 21 May 2010.

IKAROS spun at 20–25 revolutions per minute and finished unfurling its sail on 10 June 2010. The craft contains two tiny ejectable cameras, DCAM1 and DCAM2. DCAM2 was used to photograph the sail after deployment on 14 July 2010.

Acceleration and attitude control (orientation) were successfully tested during the remaining six-month voyage to Venus. On 9 July 2010, JAXA confirmed that IKAROS is being accelerated by its solar sail, and on 23 July announced successful attitude control.  Over a 23-hour period of time, the solar angle of the sail was changed by a half a degree, not by using thrusters, but by dynamically controlling the reflectivity of the 80 liquid crystal panels at the outer edge of the sail so that the sunlight pressure would produce torque.
IKAROS continues to spin at approximately 2 rpm, requiring the LCD panels to be cycled at that rate for attitude control.

According to JAXA, IKAROS finished all planned experiments in Dec 2010, but the mission has continued beyond that date "in order to enhance the skill of controlling solar sail". On 30 November 2012, JAXA announced that IKAROS had been recognized by Guinness World Records as the world's first solar sail spacecraft between planets, and that its two separated cameras, DCAM1 and DCAM2, had been recognized as the smallest size of a spacecraft flying between planets.
As of 2012, the IKAROS continued to spin, but its attitude control had degraded. This resulted in unexpected sail motions and as a result, downlink through the medium-gain antenna was only intermittently available. The project team was dissolved on 28 March 2013, although a trial receipt of data was planned for a later date.

The project was reactivated on 20 June 2013 in the expectation that the satellite would wake up from a hibernation state as more power from the solar panels became available. The team was able to receive telemetry from the IKAROS between 20 June and 12 September 2013, after which contact was again lost. The loss of contact was around the predicted time of the spacecraft again entering a low-power hibernation mode as power from the solar panels decreased. Available communication time through the Usuda Deep Space Center antenna was limited, so data was gathered only intermittently to estimate the speed, trajectory and rotation of the satellite.

Transmissions were again received on 22 May 2014, the spacecraft flying at a distance of about 230 million kilometers from the Earth. By May 2014, IKAROS was on a ten-month orbit around the Sun, spending seven months of each orbit in hibernation mode due to insufficient power. By 23 April 2015, the spacecraft woke up from hibernation mode for the 4th time and was flying at a distance of about 120 million kilometers from the Earth. On 21 May 2015, JAXA could not receive a signal from IKAROS and concluded that the spacecraft had shifted to the hibernation mode for the fifth time, as expected. Based in May 2015 data the position of IKAROS at the time was about 110 million kilometers away from the Earth, and about 130 million kilometers from the Sun.

Scientific results
From the gamma-ray polarization data of GAP, Toma et al. put a stricter limit on CPT violation.  It is an improvement of eight orders of magnitude over previous limits.

JAXA scientists stated on 9 July 2010 that the measured thrust force by the solar radiation pressure on IKAROS' 196 m2 sail is 1.12 millinewtons.

See also

Notes

References

External links

 Successful Image Shooting by the Second Separation Camera – 28 June 2010 JAXA press release
 Solar Sail Navigation Technology of IKAROS

Japanese space probes
Solar sail spacecraft
Space probes launched in 2010
JAXA
2010 in Japan
Spacecraft launched by H-II rockets